Vasiliki Moskofidou (a.k.a. Vaso Moskofidou) is a Greek women's football striker currently playing for Odysseas Glyfadas in the Greek A Division.

She is a member of the Greek national team since 2011. In March 2012, she scored her first goal against Poland.

References

1991 births
Living people
Women's association football forwards
Greek women's footballers
Greece women's international footballers